A pulse storm is a single cell thunderstorm of substantial intensity which only produces severe weather for short periods of time. Such a storm weakens and then generates another short burst – hence "pulse".


Description
Single cell thunderstorms ordinarily form in environments with low wind shear and moderate instability, with the low wind shear contributing to a short average lifespan of less than an hour. When the instability, calculated by convective available potential energy (CAPE), is strong, the updraft will bring a larger amount of humid air very high above ground and generate a cumulonimbus cloud with high water and ice content. When the rain content, and even hail, falls from it, they can generate damaging winds brought about by downbursts. Rarely, a weak tornado develops in association with a pulse storm as the environment is only weakly sheared, or not at all.

Life cycle

One can distinguish three stages in the evolution of a pulse storm:

Formation: the upward current of the cell intensifies and allows the condensation of water vapor from the rising air parcel. This forms a cumulus congestus, then a cumulonimbus when ice crystals form at its apex which spreads horizontally in contact with the tropopause.
Maturity: downdrafts are emerging. This stage is accompanied by characteristic phenomena such as lightning and thunder, showers, and gust front.
Dissipation: the cold pool descending from the cloud extends to the earth's surface and helps to block the feed by pushing the updraft downstream. The outflow can then serve as a trigger for other single cell thunderstorms.

See also
Project NIMROD

References

Severe weather and convection

fr:Orage#Orage ordinaire et pulsatif